Châteauneuf-sur-Charente (literally 'Châteauneuf on Charente') is a commune in the Charente department in southwestern France. It is the seat of the canton of Charente-Champagne, and part of the Communauté d'agglomération du Grand Cognac.

With Cognac and Jarnac, it is one of the three towns situated in the heart of the Charente vineyards, and the smallest.

The town is established on the banks of the Charente, on the left bank of a large meander.

History

Prehistoric habitat is documented. The Fontaury site corresponds to Homo sapiens. The cave at Melon is a Mousterian site.

Thanks to aerial archaeology, vestiges of enclosures or protohistorical ditches have also been found in the commune.

The Roman road between Saintes and Périgueux passes on the hillsides at the southern limit of the commune, its right-of-way being always used and named the Boisné road.

Some Roman remains have been found mainly on the right bank, near Saint-Surin.

A late antiquity warrior cemetery (probably frank or Merovingian) has been found.

Later a castle was probably built during the time of Clovis and it was burned down around 1081.

Church 

The parish church of St. Peter is remarkable for its statuary and in particular the rider of the frontispiece, which represents the 1st Christian Roman emperor, Constantine the Great, crushing paganism. This statue symbolizes the victory of Christianity over paganism, materialized by the construction of the church, since it was built on an ancient pagan place of worship.

It is also remarkable for its 24-metre high facade divided into three vertical and three horizontal parts. It is thus considered to be one of the most beautiful church facades in Charente. From 1846 to 1860, architect Paul Abadie undertook the restoration of the church. The remarkable hinges, fittings, door knockers and the ironwork of the two glass doors giving access to the church were made in 1851 by the ironworker Pierre Boulanger. The church is partly Romanesque (12th century), partly Gothic with a Gothic bell tower (15th century).

The church hides a funny detail, a snail carved in high relief at the end of the nave, on the altar side. The garden snail is a symbol of Charentais people, supposed to represent both their mindset, discreet, peaceful, unlikely to get excited, a little homestead, and their attachment to this animal, from a culinary point of view. Inhabitants like to show this "cagouille" - as they say - to their guests. Its research occupies the children during the visit of the monument.

Population

See also
Communes of the Charente department

References

Communes of Charente